Van Wagenen is a surname. Notable people with the surname include:

Avis Stearns Van Wagenen (1841–1907), American businesswoman
Gertrude Van Wagenen, (1893-1978),an American doctor
Brodie Van Wagenen (born 1974), American sports agent and executive
Sterling Van Wagenen (born 1947), American film and stage producer, writer and director
Jeff Van Wagenen (born 1948), American professional golfer

See also
Van Wagenen House, historic house in Jersey City, New Jersey, United States
Jacobus Van Wagenen Stone House, historic house in Ulster County, New York, United States
Van Wagenen Stone House and Farm Complex, historic house in Ulster County, New York, United States

Surnames of Dutch origin